1953 is an indie rock album by Soul-Junk released in 1996. The album consists of guitar based low-fi rock, which one reviewer described as being in the ballpark of "Beck meets Danielson." Alternative Press found their musical arrangements to be outstanding, "tuneful, energetic and original", but took fault with their lyrics, which many of which are derived from scripture.

The final track of the album is actually another album itself, 1954, albeit uncut.

Track listing

Credits
Glen Galaxy (Vocals, guitar, sax)
Jon Galaxy (Bass)
Brian Cantrell (Drums, electronic percussion)
Ron Easterbrooks (Guitar, drums)
All tracks recorded and mixed by Scott Exum at DML studios unless otherwise noted.

References

1996 albums
Soul-Junk albums
Homestead Records albums